The municipal elections for Leeds were held on Thursday 7 May 1964, with one third of the council seats up for the election. Labour had gained a seat from the Conservatives in the interim.

The Liberal spike of 1962, having faltered the year before, fully unwound in this election, with the Conservatives - the party it had most harmed - seeing a slight recovery in their fortunes, by a tune of a 1.4% swing to them. That recovery, however, wasn't enough to stop Labour gaining their remaining seat in Wortley, confining them - with the exception of Beeston - to their reliable strongholds. Even there, Labour had made significant inroads, with the usually safe seats of Hyde Park and Pottemewton converted to marginals, and in the case of the latter, slashing the majority to just 147 votes. Elsewhere, the Conservatives could be encouraged by the collapse of the Liberal threat in Far Headingley and May Sexton's efforts in Westfield looking increasingly likely to return her to the council with each election.

Pre-empting the upcoming aldermanic elections that year, the Gentlemen's agreement in place between the two parties to divide aldermen totals proportional to their councillors, reapportioned a further three from the Conservatives to Labour, reflecting the new councillor totals - which were Labour's best and the Conservative's worst since 1947. 1947 was also the year in which the Communists obtained their greatest vote, a figure they very nearly matched, fielding a record number of ten candidates. Turnout fell by a percentage point on the previous year, to 36.6%.

Election result

The result had the following consequences for the total number of seats on the council after the elections:

Ward results

References

Leeds City Council election
1964
1960s in Leeds
Leeds City Council election